Iranian folklore encompasses the folk traditions that have evolved in Greater Iran.

Oral legends

Folktales
Storytelling has an important presence in Iranian culture. In classical Iran, minstrels performed for their audiences at royal courts and in public theaters. Since the time of the Safavid dynasty, storytellers and poetry readers appeared at coffeehouses.

The following are a number of folktales known to the people of Iran.
  ("Rolling Pumpkin")
  ("Moon-brow")
  ("Bitter Orange and Bergamot Orange")
  ("Old Woman's Cold"), a period in the month of Esfand, at the end of winter, during which an old woman's flock is not impregnated. She goes to Moses and asks for an extension of the cold winter days, so that her flock might copulate.
  ("Shangul and Mangul")
  ("Auntie Cockroach")

Below are a number of historical tale books that contain Iranian folktales.
  ("Amir Arsalan the Famous"), a popular legend that was narrated to Naser-ed-Din Shah.
  ("Book of Darab"), a 12th-century book by Abu Taher Tarsusi that recounts a fiction about Alexander the Great and Darius III.
 , also known as "The Persian Alexander Romances", an Iranianized version of The Romance of Alexander. Not to be confused with the classic book of Nezami.
 One Thousand and One Nights, the frame-story of which derives from the now lost Middle Persian work  ("Thousand Nights").
 , a folktale about an Iranian  that was written down during the 12th century.
 , a derivation from the Greek romance of Metiochus and Parthenope that was written down by Persian poet Onsori in the 11th century.

Heroes

Heroes in 
 Arash the Archer, who shot his arrow from the peak of Damavand to settle a land dispute between Iran and Turan. The festival of Tirgan is linked to this epic, besides having roots in the ancient myth of archangel Tishtrya.
 Rostam, a celebrated  ("border-guardian"), best known for his mournful battle with his son Sohrab. He was the son of Dastan.

Other heroes
 Koroghlu, a legendary hero who seeks to fight against the unjust, in the oral traditions of the Turkic-speaking peoples.
 Pourya-ye Vali, a 14th-century champion from Khwarezm, regarded as a role model by zurkhane athletes.
 Yaʿqub-e Leys, under the court of whom the Persian language reemerged after two centuries of eclipse by Arabic ("Two Centuries of Silence").

Characters in jokes
 Molla Nasreddin
 Dakho

Creatures

 , a scrawny old woman with a clay nose and red face who attacks pregnant women when they are alone and interferes with childbirth. It is believed that she carries a basket in which she puts the liver or lung of the mother, although a variety of other descriptions exist as well.
 Night hag, a ghost or an evil creature that causes sleep paralysis. It is believed that the creature knows about hidden treasures, and one would be told of one of them by grabbing the creature's nose. One can rescue themself from the creature by wiggling their fingers.
 Himantopodes, an evil creature that uses its flexible, leather-like legs as tentacles to grip and capture human beings. The captives will be enslaved and forced to carry the creature until they die of fatigue.
Huma ,Griffin-like mythical bird said to never come to rest, living its entire life flying invisibly high above the earth, and never alighting on the ground (in some legends it is said to have no legs)
 Demon (from Avestan ), an evil being, devil, ogre, or giant.
 Ghoul, a hideous monster with a feline head, forked tongue, hairy skin, and deformed legs that resemble the limp and skinny legs of a prematurely born infant.
 Genie, a supernatural creature, comparable to the elves and the goblins, that is believed to be created from smokeless fire and to be living invisibly alongside the visible world.
 Manticore (from Middle Persian ), a man-eater with the head of a human and the body of a lion, similar to the Egyptian sphinx.
 Amen Bird, a mythical bird in Persian literature that flies continuously and fulfills people's wishes.
 , a type of exquisite, winged fairy-like spirit ranking between angels and evil spirits. Reera, Rayra or Raira was a magical gorgeous woman that believed to brought beauty to the Northern jungles of Iran.
 The Patient Stone, the most empathetic of listeners, that is believed to absorb the sorrows and pains of the person who confides in itself. It is said that when the stone can no longer contain the pain it harbors, it bursts into pieces. It is also a very famous folktale.
  ("Chief of the Snakes"), the intelligent queen of snakes who has human features above her waist and those of a serpent below.
  (from Middle Persian , Avestan ; "raptor"), a benevolent mythical bird.
 , the king of goats, in the folklore of the Turkic-speaking people of Azerbaijan. Traditionally, the stories of takam are recited in public theaters by a minstrel called takamchi.
 , an evil spirit in the folklore of Iran's southern coastal regions who possesses individuals and harms them.

Locations
 Mount Damavand
 Mount Qaf
 Paristan

Social beliefs and practices

 Evil eye, a curse believed to be cast by a malevolent glare. To protect one from it, a pendant, gemstone or likewise that depicts an eye is used as an amulet. Another way believed to protect one from an evil eye is to release a fragrant smoke of esfand (peganum harmala) and waft it around the head of those exposed to the gaze of strangers. As this is done, an ancient prayer is also recited.
 Divination, including interpretation of objects which appear haphazardly, interpretation of involuntary bodily actions (sneezing, twitching, itches, etc.), observing animal behavior, playing cards or chick-peas, bibliomancy (e.g., using the poetry of Hafez Shirazi), mirrors and lenses, observation of the liver of a slain animal, the flame of a lamp, etc.
  ("coquetry and supplication"), a tradition between a lover and a beloved based on which the beloved hurts their lover by coquetry and the lover's response is supplication and insistence in love.
 , a sort of etiquette, defined as "the active, ritualized realization of differential status in interaction".
 In Iranian wedding tradition, it is customary to buy a silver mirror and two candles and place it on the wedding sofra (a piece of cloth), next to foods and other traditional items. The first thing that the bridegroom sees in the mirror should be the reflection of his wife-to-be.

Ceremonies

 Nowruz ("new day"), the Iranian New Year's day, celebrated on the vernal equinox.
 Traditional heralds: Amu Nowruz and Haji Firuz
  ("Red Wednesday"), celebrated on the eve of the last Wednesday before Nowruz by performing rituals such as jumping over bonfires and lighting off firecrackers and fireworks.
 Problem-solving nuts
 , celebrated 13 days after Nowruz (Farvardin 13, usually coincided with April 1 or 2) by picnicking.
 , marking "the longest night of the year" and commemorating the birth of the ancient goddess Mithra on the eve of the winter solstice (usually falling on December 20 or 21).

Folk-games
  ("peg [and] bat"), identical to tip-cat.
  ("uncle chain-maker")
 , a counting-out game, used as a children's nursery rhyme.
  ("sunshine-moonlight")
 , a card game that is identical to poker.
 Tag
 , a trick-taking card game.
 Court piece, a trick-taking card game that is identical to whist.
 Hopscotch
 Backgammon, a two-player board game.
 , a fishing card game.
 Knucklebones
 Hide-and-seek
 , a trick-taking card game that is identical to rook.
  ("donkey-cop"), identical to leapfrog.

See also
 Iranian folk music
 Persian dance
 Persian theatre

References

Further reading

 
 
 Friedl, Erika. "Women in Contemporary Persian Folktales". In: Women in the Muslim World. Edited by Lois Beck and Nikki Keddie. Cambridge, MA and London, England: Harvard University Press, 1978. pp. 629-650. .
 . (1969). “Aus dem persischen Märchenschatz”. In: Ethnologia Europaea 2(1), pp. 184-193. doi: https://doi.org/10.16995/ee.3146
 
 . Typologie des persischen Volksmärchens. Beirut: Orient-Inst. der Deutschen Morgenländischen Ges.; Wiesbaden: Steiner [in Komm.], 1984.
  muse.jhu.edu/article/481770.

External links

 Iran: Daily life and social customs. From the Encyclopædia Britannica.
 Folklore studies of Iran, Afghanistan and Tajikistan. From the Encyclopædia Iranica.
 Folk poetry. From the Encyclopædia Iranica.
 The passion (taʿzia) of Ḥosayn by Peter Chelkowski. From the Encyclopædia Iranica.
 Lee Lee Hozak, on Iranian folkloric songs among Iranian Americans, from Homa Sarshar's In The Back Alleys of Exile (vol. 2; p. 304).

 
Iranian culture
Folklore by country